Antonio Esparragoza Betancourt (born 2 September 1959) is a Venezuelan former boxer who is a former WBA Featherweight Champion of the World.

Amateur career 
Esparragoza represented Venezuela as a Featherweight at the 1980 Moscow Olympic Games.  Below are the results from that tournament:

 Round of 64: bye
 Round of 32: lost to Peter Hanlon (Great Britain) by decision, 1-4

Professional career 
Esparragoza turned pro in 1981 and after largely fighting unproven fighters in his native Venezuela was granted a shot at Lineal & WBA Featherweight Titles holder Steve Cruz in 1987. Esparragoza pulled off an upset with a TKO in the 12th round. Esparragoza defended the titles against seven contenders before losing the belts to Yong-Kyun Park in 1991 via unanimous decision. He retired after the loss.

Due to his incredible knockout power, Esparragoza is ranked at 75 in Ring Magazine's list of 100 Greatest Punchers.

Professional boxing record

See also
Lineal championship
 List of featherweight boxing champions

References 
 
 sports-reference

|-

|-

|-

1959 births
Living people
People from Cumaná
Olympic boxers of Venezuela
Boxers at the 1980 Summer Olympics
Venezuelan male boxers
World Boxing Association champions
AIBA World Boxing Championships medalists
Featherweight boxers